Æthelhelm was the son of King Æthelred of Wessex.

Æthelhelm, also Aethelhelm or Ethelhelm may also refer to: 
Athelm (died 926) or Æthelhelm, first bishop of Wells and later Archbishop of Canterbury
Æthelhelm (died 897), ealdorman of Wiltshire and possibly father of Ælfflaed, second wife of Edward the Elder
Æthelhelm, a nobleman in whose household Oda, the future Archbishop of Canterbury had been active before becoming bishop of Ramsbury